The 1979 Alan King Tennis Classic was a men's tennis tournament played on outdoor hard courts at the Caesars Palace in Las Vegas, Nevada in the United States that was part of the 1979 Colgate-Palmolive Grand Prix. It was the eighth edition of the tournament was held from April 23 through April 29, 1979. First-seeded Björn Borg won the singles title and earned $33,750 first-prize money.

Finals

Singles
 Björn Borg defeated  Jimmy Connors 6–3, 6–2
 It was Borg's 5th singles title of the year and the 44th of his career.

Doubles
 Sherwood Stewart /  Marty Riessen defeated  Adriano Panatta /  Raúl Ramírez 4–6, 6–4, 7–6(9–7)

References

External links
 ITF tournament edition details

Alan King Tennis Classic
Alan King Tennis Classic
Alan King Tennis Classic
Alan King Tennis Classic
Tennis in Las Vegas
Alan King Tennis Classic